Fyodor Sergeyevich Kuzmin (also Fedor Kuzmin, ; born 17 April 1983 in Rybinsk, Russian SFSR) is a Russian table tennis player. Kuzmin won a gold medal in the men's singles at the 2005 ITTF Pro Tour series in Velenje, Slovenia. He also captured a silver medal, along with his partner Oksana Fadeyeva, in the mixed doubles at the 2007 European Championships in Belgrade, Serbia, losing out to the defending Eastern European pair Aleksandar Karakašević (Serbia) and Rūta Paškauskienė (Lithuania). As of October 2014, Kuzmin is ranked no. 164 in the world by the International Table Tennis Federation (ITTF). He is also right-handed, and uses the classic grip.

Kuzmin qualified for the men's singles tournament at the 2008 Summer Olympics in Beijing, by receiving a place as one of the top 8 seeded players from the European Qualification Tournament in Nantes, France. He received a single bye for the first round match, before losing out to Italy's Mihai Bobocica, with a set score of 1–4. Kuzmin also joined with his fellow players Alexei Smirnov and four-time Olympian Dmitry Mazunov for the inaugural men's team event. Kuzmin and his team placed fourth in the preliminary pool round against Japan, Hong Kong, and Nigeria, receiving a total score of three points and three straight losses.

References

External links
 
 NBC 2008 Olympics profile

1983 births
Living people
Russian male table tennis players
Table tennis players at the 2008 Summer Olympics
Olympic table tennis players of Russia
People from Rybinsk
Sportspeople from Yaroslavl Oblast